Grevillea wickhamii  (Wickham's grevillea, Arajukaljukua, Ijaka or Lukkulburra)  is an erect shrub or small tree to 6 metres in height that is endemic to  Western Australia, Northern Territory and Queensland. It has grey-green leaves which have a holly-like shape.

There are a number of subspecies which have flowers in a wide range of colours including red, pink, orange and yellow. They are as follows:
Grevillea wickhamii subsp. aprica 
Grevillea wickhamii subsp. cratista 
Grevillea wickhamii subsp. hispidula 
Grevillea wickhamii subsp. macrodonta      
Grevillea wickhamii subsp. pallida 
Grevillea wickhamii subsp. wickhamii

References

External links
 
Florabase: Grevillea wickhamii (list of subspecies)

wickhamii
Flora of the Northern Territory
Flora of Queensland
Eudicots of Western Australia
Proteales of Australia
Taxa named by Carl Meissner